Edgemont, California may refer to:

Edgemont, Lassen County, California
Edgemont, Riverside County, California

See also
 Edgemont Acres, California
 Edgemont (disambiguation)